Thomas Hugh McLean (30 November 1931 – 25 March 2017) was an Australian rules footballer who played with Melbourne and North Melbourne in the Victorian Football League (VFL). North cleared him to Sandringham before the 1957 season, and he remained there until 1961 and was captain of the club.

Notes

External links 

http://demonwiki.org/Tom+McLean Demonwiki profile
		
		

1931 births
Australian rules footballers from Victoria (Australia)		
Melbourne Football Club players		
North Melbourne Football Club players
Sandringham Football Club players		
2017 deaths